Vivek Mushran (born 9 August 1969) is an Indian actor.

Career
After leaving Sherwood College, Nainital, he started his career in 1991 with the blockbuster Hindi movie Saudagar and has appeared in many other movies, including Ram Jaane, the Sachin-directed Aisi Bhi Kya Jaldi Hai, First Love Letter and Anjaane. He has also acted in the STAR Plus TV sitcom Son Pari, the Zee TV serial Kittie Party, and he was seen in the Sony TV serial Bhaskar Bharti and the Doordarshan TV serial Ae Dil-E-Naadaan. The serial he worked in most recently was Baat Hamari Pakki Hai on Sony TV. He has sung songs in his album Kahin Kho Gaya. His latest role was as Inder, Saachi's uncle in Baat Hamari Pakki Hai (Sony TV). He also worked in Parvarrish – Kuchh Khattee Kuchh Meethi. he  worked in the serial Nisha Aur Uske Cousins and played the role of the father of the main character. He has also played the role of Vikramjeet Singh in Sony TV series Main Maike Chali Jaungi Tum Dekhte Rahiyo.

Filmography

Television

References

External links 

 

1969 births
Living people
Male actors from Uttar Pradesh
Sherwood College alumni
Male actors in Hindi cinema
People from Sonbhadra district
20th-century Indian male actors
21st-century Indian male actors
Indian male comedians